The Chyabrung also Kay/Ke in Limbu language is a traditional drum of the Limbu community in Nepal, Sikkim, Darjeeling hills and North-East India.The Chyabrung is a hollow oblong wooden drum about a two meters in diameter and two feet in length. The drum is strung around the neck with a cord at stomach height and played during auspicious festivals Chasok Tangnam of the Limbu community.

Construction 

The Chyabrung has two openings on either ends, each end being tightly stretched by cow and bull/buffalo skin: on the right and left ends respectively. The face covered by cow skin produces a sharp, treble tone whilst the face covered by bull/buffalo skin produces a flat, bass sound.

The cow skin face is called huksagay and is played with the palm of the hand the bull/buffalo  side is called singsagay and played with a stick called kay chhari.

Chyabrung dance 
The Limbus whilst playing the Chyabrung perform the Chyabrung dance during the festivals of Kelangma and Yalakma (Dhan Naach or rice harvest dance). The only music to the dance is the rhythmic beating of the Chyabrung and dancers execute synchronized and complicated foot work depicting graceful movements of wild animals and birds.

See also 

 Maadal
 Dhimay
 Music of Nepal

References

Nepalese music
Drums
Asian percussion instruments
Drums of Nepal
Limbu culture
Culture of Koshi Province